Nina Wallet Intalou (born 1963) is a Malian businesswoman and politician who has served as Minister of Crafts and Tourism of Mali since July 2016.

Early life and education
Intalou was born in Kidal in 1963. She is of Tuareg origin, belonging to the Idnane tribe. Her father was a sergeant-major of the gendarmerie in Kidal. She has a license in public law.

Career
Intalou has been a political activist and member of the Tuareg independence movement since 1984. In 1989, she founded a construction and sanitation company in Abidjan, Ivory Coast.

Intalou was elected mayor of Kidal in 1997, but Islamist pressures forced her to give up the post. President Alpha Oumar Konaré offered her a post of territorial adviser instead. In exile in Mauritania, she took part in the 2012 insurrection and became the only female member of the executive committee of the National Movement for the Liberation of Azawad, a separatist group seeking an independent Azawad. Tiébilé Dramé, emissary of interim president Dioncounda Traoré, called her the "strong man" of the group. In October 2015, she became vice president of the Truth, Justice and Reconciliation Commission.

Intalou was appointed Minister of Crafts and Tourism by President Ibrahim Boubacar Keïta on 7 July 2016. Her appointment was seen as helping create a political-ethnic balance within the government, calming those who were impatient with the slow implementation of the June 2015 Inter Malian peace agreement. She has been criticised as unqualified by nationalists in Bamako, and been the target of a hostile media campaign.

Personal life
Intalou has three children with her former husband, who is a nephew of former Ivory Coast President Félix Houphouët-Boigny.

References

1963 births
Living people
Tourism ministers of Mali
Members of the National Movement for the Liberation of Azawad
21st-century Malian women politicians
Mayors of places in Mali
Tuareg people
People from Kidal Region
21st-century Malian politicians